is the second single by Japanese girl group Nogizaka46, released on May 2, 2012. It reached number one in the Oricon Weekly Chart. It sold 156,000 copies. It reached number two on the Billboard Japan Hot 100.

Release 
This single was released in 4 versions. Type-A, Type-B, Type-C and a regular edition. The first three editions are CD+DVD. Rina Ikoma's first solo song Mizutama Moyou is included in Type-B. The center position in the choreography for the title song is held by Rina Ikoma.

Track listing

Type-A

Type-B

Type-C

Regular Edition

Chart and certifications

Oricon Charts

Certifications

References

Further reading

External links
 Discography on Nogizaka46 Official Website 
 
 Nogizaka46 Movie Digest on YouTube

2012 singles
Japanese-language songs
Oricon Weekly number-one singles
Nogizaka46 songs
Songs with lyrics by Yasushi Akimoto
2012 songs